The Sportswriter is a 1986 novel by Richard Ford, and the first of four books of fiction to feature the protagonist Frank Bascombe. In The Sportswriter, Bascombe is portrayed as a failed novelist turned sportswriter who undergoes an existential crisis following the death of his son. The sequel to The Sportswriter is the Pulitzer Prize-winning Independence Day, published in 1995. After the third installment in the series, titled The Lay of the Land, was published in 2006, the three books together are sometimes identified as "The Bascombe Trilogy." Ford called them "The Bascombe Novels." In 2014, a fourth book in the series, titled Let Me Be Frank With You, was published.

In 2007, HBO announced that it was adapting the books into a six-hour HBO miniseries, but HBO subsequently dropped their option, and any future plans to adapt the novels for the screen have been shelved.

When it appeared in 1986, The Sportswriter was Ford's third published novel.

The Sportswriter is mentioned several times in Lee Ranaldo's JRNLS80s.

Awards and nominations
The novel was named one of Time magazine's five best books of 1986 and was a finalist for the PEN/Faulkner Award for Fiction. In 2005, Time also named it one of the 100 best novels in English from 1923 to 2010.

References

External links
Richard Ford discusses The Sportswriter on the BBC's World Book Club

1986 American novels
Novels by Richard Ford
Novels set in New Jersey
Novels about writers
PEN/Faulkner Award for Fiction-winning works